Joseph Cervantes (born January 19, 1961) is an American attorney in private practice in Las Cruces, New Mexico, and currently a member of the New Mexico Senate, representing the 31st District since 2012.

Early life and education
Joseph Cervantes was born in Las Cruces, New Mexico, and raised farming near La Mesa in southern Doña Ana County.  Cervantes graduated from Las Cruces High School in 1979, and the University of New Mexico with a Bachelor of Arts in architecture in 1983.  In 1985, Cervantes received a Master of Architecture degree from California Polytechnic State University.  He was licensed as an architect by the State of California in 1987 and became an associate member of the American Institute of Architects (AIA).

In 1991 Cervantes received a J.D. degree from the University of New Mexico School of Law, where he was a member of the UNM Law Review, and National Moot Court and Mock Trial teams.

Professional and business careers
Cervantes practiced architecture in La Jolla, California, with Dale Naegle & Associates before returning to New Mexico in 1987 for the construction of elementary school projects for the Gadsden School District in Anthony and Sunland Park N.M.  After graduating from law school in 1991, Cervantes worked for the Albuquerque law firm Modrall Sperling Roehl Harris & Sisk, until founding the Cervantes Law Firm in 1995.  In 2017 Cervantes joined partners to form the trial law firm Cervantes Scherr Legate. Cervantes is a member of the New Mexico State Bar, the ABA Litigation Section, and a former member of the Inn of Courts.  Cervantes represents New Mexico on the Uniform Law Commission (ULC).

In addition to practicing law, Cervantes has business interests in commercial real estate and development, farming and agricultural processing, in southern New Mexico.

Community affairs
Cervantes is a recipient of the Dixon First Amendment Freedom Award from the New Mexico Foundation for Open Government, and served on the Board of Directors for New Mexico First, and Leadership New Mexico.  He is a parishioner of St. Albert the Great Newman Center in Las Cruces.

Elective office
Cervantes was elected as National Delegate to the Democratic National Conventions in 1988 and 2000, and as Democratic state party Treasurer.

Cervantes was first elected to public office in 1998 defeating Republican incumbent Doña Ana County Commissioner Dora Harp.  In 2001, Cervantes was appointed to the New Mexico House of Representatives, and was reelected in five successive campaigns through 2012.  In the New Mexico House of Representatives, Cervantes was appointed as Chairman of the House Judiciary Committee, Vice-Chairman of the House Rules Committee, and Chairman of the interim Water & Natural Resources Committee.  In 2011, Cervantes was appointed as Co-Chairman of the House Rules Subcommittee for impeachment of Public Regulation Commissioner Jerome Block.

In 2012, Cervantes announced he would seek the New Mexico Senate seat vacated by the retirement of Sen. Cynthia Nava.  In the June 2012 Democratic primary election Cervantes defeated former Sunland Park Mayor Jesus Ruben Segura. Cervantes went on to win with 68.26% of the general election vote.

Cervantes announced his bid for Governor of New Mexico in 2017 for the 2018 election.  In the Senate Cervantes was selected to be Chairman of the Conservation Committee in 2017, and in 2020 as Chairman of the Senate Judiciary Committee.

Personal life

Cervantes and his wife, New York Times bestselling author Jennifer Cervantes, are parents of three daughters, Alex, Bella, and Jules and reside in Doña Ana County.

A self-proclaimed Roman Catholic, Cervantes made news when his clergy attempted to advise him through pastoral dialogue, which Cervantes evaded. When he was then denied Holy Communion because of his public stand against Church teaching, Cervantes chose to publicize the church sanction, politicizing the situation with his statements to the press on the matter.

References

External links
Representative Joseph Cervantes at the NM House website
Project Vote Smart - Representative Joseph Cervantes (NM) profile
Follow the Money - Joseph Cervantes
2006 2004 2002 campaign contributions

1961 births
Living people
Hispanic and Latino American state legislators in New Mexico
Democratic Party members of the New Mexico House of Representatives
Democratic Party New Mexico state senators
Politicians from Las Cruces, New Mexico
21st-century American politicians